Villadiezma is a hamlet of Osorno la Mayor located in the province of Palencia, Castile and León, Spain. According to the 2007 census (INE), the village has a population of 90 inhabitants.

Hamlets in the Province of Palencia